is a Japanese monthly seinen manga anthology published by Kodansha under the Afternoon line of magazines. The first issue was released with a cover date of January 25, 1986. Afternoon has spawned many successful manga series such as Oh My Goddess!, Genshiken, Blade of the Immortal and Big Windup!. It is part of Kodansha's "1day" series, which also includes the magazines Morning and Evening. A spin-off magazine, named good! Afternoon, started publishing on November 7, 2008.

History 
The magazine was founded as a sister magazine to Morning by the same publisher. According to Frederik L. Schodt, stories that did not convince the editors of Morning would often land in Afternoon.

Many of the artists working for the magazine used to publish amateur dojinshi and were influenced by lolicon amateur manga. Sharon Kinsella claims that around half of all series featured in Afternoon between 1994 and 1997 were inspired by lolicon aesthetics. She lists Discommunication, Gunsmith Cats, Assembler 0X, Seraphic Feather, Aqua ańd Oh! My Goddess as examples.

From 1999 until 2022, Afternoon Season Zōkan was published as a quarterly spin-off magazine to Afternoon. After the magazine was suspended, some of its series, like Mushishi and Mokke, were transferred to Afternoon.

Newcomer award 
Since 1987, the magazine hands out the newcomer award Afternoon Shiki Shō. In 2000, Kodansha published a selection of winners of the award in a book.

Circulation and demographic 
Like with most major manga magazines, the magazine's circulation has been declining since the 1990s:

 2004: 144.500
 2005: 133.800
 2006: 127.400
 2007: 119.666
 2016: 69.310

In the late 1990s, the magazine's editors guessed that about a third of the readers of the magazine could be called otaku.

Features

Ongoing 
There are currently 28 manga titles being serialized in Monthly Afternoon. Out of them, Wandering Island is on hiatus.

Past

1980s 
 by Kōsuke Fujishima (1988–2014)
 by Norifusa Mita (1989)
Spirit of Wonder by Kenji Tsuruta (1989–1994) (originally serialized in Weekly Morning)

1990s 
 by Hitoshi Iwaaki (1990–1995) (moved from Morning Open Zōkan)
 by Kia Asamiya (1990–1992)
 by Kenichi Sonoda (1991–1997)
 by Riichi Ueshiba (1991–1999)
 by Tsutomu Takahashi (1992–1999)
 by Kia Asamiya (1992–1995)
 by Kazuichi Hanawa (1992–1994)
  by Hiroaki Samura (1993–2012)
 by Yo Morimoto, Toshiya Takeda (story) and Hiroyuki Utatane (art) (1993–2008)
 by Daisuke Igarashi (1994–1996)
 by Shinji Makari (story) and Akana Shu (art) (1994–2004)
 by Hitoshi Ashinano (1994–2006)
 by Mohiro Kitoh (1995–1997)
Blame! by Tsutomu Nihei (1997–2003)
 by Satoshi Shiki (1997–2003)
 by Kenichi Sonoda (1997–2004)
Eden: It's an Endless World! by Hiroki Endo (1997–2008)
 by Mohiro Kitoh (1998–2003)
 by Kon Kimura (1998–2006)
 by Yoshito Asari (1999–2000)

2000s 
 by Shohei Manabe (2000)
 by Iou Kuroda (2000–2002)
 by Riichi Ueshiba (2001–2003)
 by Kenji Tsuruta (2001–2002)
 by Yoshito Asari (2001–2009)
 by Shimoku Kio (2002–2006)
 by Daisuke Igarashi (2002–2005)
 by Yuki Urushibara (2002–2008) (moved from Afternoon Season Zōkan)
 by Takatoshi Kumakura (2003–2009) (moved from Afternoon Season Zōkan)
Shadow Skill by Megumu Okada (2003–2006)
 by Minoru Toyoda (2003–2005)
 by Tooru Fujisawa (2003–2004)
 by Kia Asamiya (2003)
 by Akira Hiramoto (2003–2008) (transferred to Young Magazine the 3rd)
 by Makoto Shinkai (original work) and Sumomo Yumeka  (2004–2005)
 by Masaru Katori (story) and Jiro Ando (art) (2004–2008)
 by Yuzo Takada (2004–2008)
Gunsmith Cats BURST by Kenichi Sonoda (2004–2008)
 by Harutoshi Fukui (original novel), Takashi Nagasaki and Takayuki Kosai (2005–2007)
 by Mahiro Maeda (2005–2008)
 by Mami Kashiwabara (2005–2011)
 by Makoto Shinkai (original work) and Sumomo Yumeka (2005–2006)
 by Riichi Ueshiba (2006–2014)
 by Daisaku Tsuru (2006–2010)
 by Yutaka Tanaka (2006–2009)
 by Kazuki Nakashima (original story) and Una Hamana (2007–2009)
 by Hitoshi Ashinano (2007–2013)
 by Haru Akiyama (2008–2011)
 by Shimoku Kio (2008–2010)
 by Yoshiki Tanaka (story) and Narumi Kakinouchi (art) (2009)
 by Tsutomu Nihei (2009–2015)
 by Yuki Urushibara (2009–2010)

2010s 
 by Yoshiki Tanaka (story) and Narumi Kakinouchi (art) (2010)
 by Makoto Shinkai (story) and Seike Yukiko (art) (2010–2011)
 by Kenichi Sonoda (2010–2012)
 by Tetsuya Imai (2011)
 by Kenshin Hidekawa (2011–2015)
 by Yoshiki Tanaka (story) and Narumi Kakinouchi (art) (2012)
 by Yoshiki Tanaka (story) and Narumi Kakinouchi (art) (2012–2013)
 by	Ao Akato (2013)
 by Kaori Ozaki (2013)
 by Makoto Shinkai (story) and Midori Motohashi (art) (2013)
 by Daisuke Igarashi (2015–2019)
Black-Box (manga) by Tsutomu Takahashi (2015–2019)
 by Makoto Shinkai (story) and Tsubasa Yamaguchi (art) (2016)
 by	Ao Akato (2016)
 by Yu Yoshidamaru (2016–2019)
 by Kaori Ozaki (2017–2019)
 by Shimoku Kio (2018–2022)
 by Yuki Urushibara (2018–2020)
 by Makoto Shinkai (original work) and Wataru Kubota (2019–2020)
  by Uhei Aoki (story) and Kumichi Yoshizuki (art) (2019–2021)
 by Yukito Ayatsuji (story) and Hiro Kiyohara (art) (2019–2022)

2020s 
 by Mikumi Yuuchi (2020–2021)
 by Kaze Miura (2020–2021)
 by Michi Ichiho (story) and Nori Arashiyama (art) (2021)
 by Fiok Lee (2021–2022)
 by Yasuhiro Yoshiura (original story) and Megumu Maeda (art) (2021–2022)

References

External links
 

1986 establishments in Japan
Kodansha magazines
Magazines established in 1986
Magazines published in Tokyo
Monthly manga magazines published in Japan
Seinen manga magazines